Life in General may refer to:

 Life in General (album), an album by MxPx
 Life in General (web series), a web series created by Karen Harris for Strike.TV